Fort Parkway is a prospective new parkway railway station to the east of Birmingham, England. It has yet to be passed and is still in planning stages.

It would be located on the Birmingham to Peterborough Line, nearby to the old Bromford Bridge station, and would give the east of Birmingham local commuter trains easing congestion on the roads into the city. The close proximity to the motorways would draw in longer distance passengers who wish to commute into the West Midlands conurbation. It would also provide new railway access to the Fort Shopping Centre, Fort Dunlop, Bromford, Birches Green and Ward End.

The station has been called Fort Parkway instead of Bromford Bridge after the nearby A47, called Fort Parkway. 

All but one station (Water Orton) has been axed between Tamworth and Birmingham, leaving locals isolated, with no rail link. The station would serve these communities in addition to passengers drawn from the motorway network.

It would provide Park and Ride facilities, with a large car park.

It is planned to have two platforms on the existing multiple tracked line.

References

Proposed railway stations in England